Filip Šindelář (born October 30, 1979) is a Czech former professional ice hockey goaltender.

Šindelář played in the Czech Extraliga for HC Sparta Praha, HC Bílí Tygři Liberec, BK Mladá Boleslav and HC Vítkovice. He also played in the Tipsport Liga for MHK Dubnica during the 2004–05 season.

References

External links

1979 births
Living people
HC Benátky nad Jizerou players
HC Bílí Tygři Liberec players
Czech ice hockey goaltenders
HK Dubnica players
BK Havlíčkův Brod players
SK Horácká Slavia Třebíč players
KLH Vajgar Jindřichův Hradec players
BK Mladá Boleslav players
People from Vlašim
HC RT Torax Poruba players
HC Slezan Opava players
HC Sparta Praha players
HC Stadion Litoměřice players
Hokej Šumperk 2003 players
HC Tábor players
HC Vítkovice players
HC Vrchlabí players
Sportspeople from the Central Bohemian Region
Czech expatriate ice hockey players in Slovakia